Rarities Vol. I: The Covers is a compilation album by the American punk rock band No Use for a Name, released August 11, 2017 through Fat Wreck Chords. It consists of cover versions that the band recorded over the course of their career, and which were previously released on compilations, soundtracks, and tribute albums. One of several No Use for a Name collections released in the years following the death of band leader Tony Sly, Rarities Vol. I follows a 2016 re-release of the band's "best-of" compilation All the Best Songs, and was followed by Rarities Vol. 2: The Originals in 2021.

Track listing 
Credits adapted from the album's liner notes.

Personnel 
Credits adapted from the album's liner notes.
 Tony Sly – vocals, guitar
 Chris Shiflett – guitar (tracks 1–3, 8, 9, 11–13)
 Dave Nassie – guitar (tracks 4–7, 10)
 Matt Riddle – bass, vocals
 Rory Koff – drums
 Meegan Lair – guest vocals (track 8)
 Ryan Greene – audio engineer, mixing engineer
 Randy Steffes – audio engineer (track 5)
 Compiled by Fat Mike and Chad Williams
 Tardon Feathered – tape transfers, mastering
 Greg Dixon – photographs
 Sergie Loobkoff – artwork, layout

References 

No Use for a Name albums
Fat Wreck Chords compilation albums
2017 albums